Jéferson Lima de Menezes, commonly known as Gauchinho (born February 11, 1983 in Santana do Livramento) is a Brazilian footballer currently playing for São José-PA in the Campeonato Brasileiro Série D.

Career
Gauchinho started his professional career in 2002 at Brazilian giants Flamengo, making his debut in the Campeonato Brasileiro in 2003 on July 20 against Criciúma. He played 20 Série A games and 3 Cup games for Flamengo, and spent a brief period on loan with Remo, before moving to Denmark in 2006.

He subsequently spent four years playing with Næstved in the Danish 1st Division, before signing with AC St. Louis of the USSF Division 2 Professional League in February, 2010.

References

External links
 Flamengo profile
 Futpedia profile

1983 births
Living people
People from Santana do Livramento
Brazilian footballers
AC St. Louis players
CR Flamengo footballers
Clube do Remo players
Næstved Boldklub players
Brazilian expatriate footballers
Expatriate men's footballers in Denmark
USSF Division 2 Professional League players
Association football midfielders
Sportspeople from Rio Grande do Sul